Lycée Gustave Eiffel is a senior high school/sixth-form college in Gagny, Seine-Saint-Denis, France, in the Paris metropolitan area.

References

External links
 Lycée Gustave Eiffel 

Lycées in Seine-Saint-Denis